The following is the order of battle of the Hellenic Army during the First Balkan War of 1912–1913.

Background 

Following the defeat in the Greco-Turkish War of 1897, starting in 1904 and especially after the Goudi coup of 1909, serious efforts were undertaken to reorganize and modernize the Army. From 1911, this task was undertaken by a French military mission. The peacetime establishment of the Hellenic Army in 1912 comprised four infantry divisions (1st at Larissa, 2nd at Athens, 3rd at Missolonghi and 4th at Nafplion) newly reformed as triangular divisions, a cavalry brigade, six Evzones battalions, four field artillery and two mountain artillery regiments, one fortress artillery battalion and various support units, including two engineer regiments and an aircraft company. From 25 March 1912, Crown Prince Constantine assumed the position of Inspector-General of the Army, becoming its de facto commander-in-chief.

Greece's territorial claims in Macedonia and Thrace clashed with those of Bulgaria, leading in the so-called 'Macedonian Struggle' between the two in 1904–1908, an armed guerrilla and propaganda conflict over influence over the local Christian populations. Nevertheless, from 1910 on, negotiations for the formation of a Greco-Bulgarian alliance, and later of a Balkan League  encompassing all Christian Balkan states, began in earnest. Nevertheless, due to the defeat of 1897, the Greek army on land was generally disregarded as a serious factor, even among the Balkan allies.

Mobilization 
The decree of mobilization was also carried out on Crete, which although formally an autonomous state was annexed into Greece. The existing units were brought up to full strength, and the 5th, 6th, and 7th infantry divisions were set up. The number of men from the Greek diaspora, or foreign philhellenes, who rushed to Greece to join up was such that the 6th and 7th divisions were able to have three-battalion regiments, instead of the two-battalion regiments originally envisaged. 

The Greek war plan had been updated as recently as 1912, and envisaged the division of the mobilized army into three parts:
 the Army of Thessaly (Στρατιά Θεσσαλίας), with three army corps and seven infantry divisions, with a total fore of about 100,000 men, 25,000 animals, and 3,500 vehicles
 the Army of Epirus (Στρατιά Ηπείρου), with an ad hoc assemblage of five infantry regiments and other units, with a total force of 13,000 men, 4,200 animals and 400 vehicles
 the rear area army, or Army of the Interior (Στρατός Εσωτερικού), with 17,000 men, 2,900 animals, and 1,800 vehicles
In contrast to pre-war planning, no army corps were established; instead, the divisions were directly subordinated to GHQ of the Army of Thessaly. The latter, which comprised the bulk of the Greek Army, was placed under the command of the Crown Prince and gathered around Larissa, while the Army of Epirus formed around Arta under Lieutenant General Konstantinos Sapountzakis.

Army of Thessaly, 18 October 1912 

The Army of Thessaly comprised in total 59 infantry and 4 Evzone battalions, eight cavalry companies (of the Cavalry Brigade) and six half-companies (organic to the infantry divisions), seven engineer companies (organic to the infantry divisions), 32 artillery batteries with 96 field guns, 24 mountain guns and 54 fortress guns and 70 machine-guns, and various support troops including an aviation company with four aircraft.  The force totalled some 100,000 men, with  front-line effectives. On  these were organized in the following formations: 

1st Infantry Division (Ι Μεραρχία), under Maj Gen Emmanouil Manousogiannakis, at Ampelonas
2nd Infantry Regiment
4th Infantry Regiment
5th Infantry Regiment
1st and 2nd squadrons of the 1st Field Artillery Regiment
2nd Infantry Division (II Μεραρχία), under Maj Gen Konstantinos Kallaris, at Tyrnavos
1st Infantry Regiment
3rd Infantry Regiment
7th Infantry Regiment
1st and 2nd squadrons of the 2nd Field Artillery Regiment
3rd Infantry Division (III Μεραρχία), under Maj Gen Konstantinos Damianos, west of Larissa
6th Infantry Regiment
10th Infantry Regiment
12th Infantry Regiment
1st and 2nd squadrons of the 3rd Field Artillery Regiment
3rd Mountain Artillery Squadron
4th Infantry Division (IV Μεραρχία), under Maj Gen Konstantinos Moschopoulos, at Petrino
8th Infantry Regiment
9th Infantry Regiment
11th Infantry Regiment
1st and 2nd squadrons of the 4th Field Artillery Regiment
1st Mountain Artillery Squadron
5th Infantry Division (V Μεραρχία), under Col Dimitrios Matthaiopoulos, at Krannonas
16th Infantry Regiment
22nd Infantry Regiment
23rd Infantry Regiment
3rd Squadron of the 1st Field Artillery Regiment
2nd Mountain Artillery Squadron
6th Infantry Division (VI Μεραρχία), under Col Konstantinos Miliotis-Komninos, at Platykambos
1st Evzone Regiment
17th Infantry Regiment
18th Infantry Regiment
3rd Squadron of the 2nd Field Artillery Regiment
7th Infantry Division (VII Μεραρχία), still forming at Larissa under Col Kleomenis Kleomenous
19th Infantry Regiment
20th Infantry Regiment
21st Infantry Regiment
3rd Squadron of the 3rd Field Artillery Regiment
Machine-gun Squadron
Cavalry Brigade (Ταξιαρχία Ιππικού), under Maj Gen Alexandros Soutsos, at Farkadona and Zarkos
1st Cavalry Regiment
3rd Cavalry Regiment
Gennadis Detachment (Απόσπασμα Γεννάδη), under Col Stefanos Gennadis, covering the army's left flank at Koniskos
1st Evzone Battalion
4th Evzone Battalion
Konstantinopoulos Detachment (Απόσπασμα Κωνσταντινοπούλου), under Col Konstantinos Konstantinopoulos, covering the army's right flank, northeast of Tyrnavos
2nd Evzone Battalion
6th Evzone Battalion

Army of Epirus 
The theatre of operations of Epirus was of secondary strategic importance, with the Army of Epirus having initially a purely defensive mission. Initially, the Army of Epirus was outnumbered by the Ottoman forces in the area (Yanya Corps under Esad Pasha), which numbered about 20,000 men. It nevertheless pushed back the initial Ottoman assaults, took Preveza and advanced to the approaches of the Ioannina fortified zone. Two attacks on the city in December and January were repulsed by the Ottoman forces, but after extensive preparations and transfer of forces from Macedonia, the city fell following the Battle of Bizani. The Army of Epirus was commanded until  by Lt Gen Konstantinos Sapountzakis, and thereafter by Crown Prince Constantine.

Order of battle, 18 October 1912 
The Army of Epirus was composed of several independent units of roughly divisional strength. Its forces numbered eight infantry and Evzone battalions, one cavalry company and 24 guns, totalling some 10,500 men in the early days of the war. At the outbreak of the war, it comprised the following units, concentrated in and around Arta:
15th Infantry Regiment
3rd Evzone Battalion
3rd Independent Evzone Battalion, 
7th Evzone Battalion
10th Reserve Evzone Battalion
2nd National Guard Battalion
2nd Fortress Artillery Squadron
3rd Field Artillery Squadron/4th Field Artillery Regiment
2nd Mountain Artillery Squadron

To these were later added two battalions of Cretans, as well as the volunteer Garibaldini legion. On , these forces formed the Epirus Division, renamed in February 1913 as the 8th Infantry Division. In early December, the Army of Epirus was reinforced with the 2nd Infantry Division, followed on 27 December by the 4th Division, by mid-January by the 6th Division and the 7th Infantry Regiment. In preparation for the Battle of Bizani, the Crown Prince brought in additional troops and artillery, while a Mixed Brigade was formed to attack the fortifications of Ioannina from the northeastern flank.

Order of battle before the Battle of Bizani 

Before the Battle of Bizani, the Army of Epirus comprised the 2nd, 4th, 6th and 8th Infantry Divisions, the Mixed Brigade, a cavalry regiment and the three independent detachments of Acheron, Preveza and Himara, in total 51 infantry battalions and other units, comprising 41,400 men with 48 machine guns and 93 field and mountain guns. 

These were grouped as follows, from the right to the left of the Greek front:
First Army Detachment (Α′ Τμήμα Στρατιάς), under Lt Gen Konstantinos Sapountzakis, on the right of the Greek front:
Mixed Metsovon Brigade (Μικτή Ταξιαρχία Μετσόβου), under Col Ioannis Papakyriazis, formed from the 4th Infantry Regiment (from 1st Division) and the Metsovon Detachment of Lt Col. Mitsas plus other units, in total six battalions, six machine guns and eight mountain guns
6th Infantry Division (VI Μεραρχία), under Col Konstantinos Miliotis-Komninos
three battalions
12 field guns
8th Infantry Division (VIII Μεραρχία), under Col Dimitrios Matthaiopoulos
Cretan Regiment, of 3 battalions and four machine guns
2nd Evzone Regiment, of 2 battalions and eight machine guns
8 field guns and four machine guns
2nd Infantry Division (II Μεραρχία), under Maj Gen Konstantinos Kallaris, comprising four and a half battalions, eight machine guns, twelve field guns and a cavalry half-company.
Second Army Detachment (Β′ Τμήμα Στρατιάς), under Maj Gen Konstantinos Moschopoulos, CO of the 4th Infantry Division on the left of the Greek front. It comprised mainly the 4th Division (IV Μεραρχία) plus units from the other divisions, organized in three columns:
First Column (Α′ Φάλαγγα) under Col Dimitrios Antoniadis, with six battalions, eight machine guns and eight mountain guns
Second Column (Β′ Φάλαγγα) under Col Ioannis Giannakitsas, with eight battalions, fourteen machine guns and eight mountain guns
Third Column (Γ′ Φάλαγγα) under Col Nikolaos Delagrammatikas, with six battalions, eight machine guns, 10 mountain guns, a cavalry half-company
Olitsikas Detachment (Απόσπασμα Ολίτσικα) of three battalions
Army Reserve or independent units within the Army's operational zone:
Epirus Cavalry Regiment (Σύνταγμα Ιππικού Ηπείρου), of three companies and two machine guns
Army Artillery, of six field and two heavy batteries, with 34 guns
Acheron Detachment (Απόσπασμα Αχέροντος) of 4 battalions, 4 machine guns and five field guns, at Paramythia
Preveza Detachment (Απόσπασμα Πρεβέζης) of two battalions, around Preveza and Filippiada
Himara Detachment (Απόσπασμα Χειμάρρας) of one battalion, two machine guns and two field guns, at Himara

References

Sources
 
 
 
 
 

First Balkan War
History of the Hellenic Army
Balkan Wars orders of battle